The 1990 Croydon Council election took place on 3 May 1990 to elect members of Croydon London Borough Council in London, England. The whole council was up for election and the Conservative party stayed in overall control of the council.

Background

Election result

Percentage includes all candidates in the alliance, however they appear on the ballot paper.

Ward results

Addiscombe

Ashburton

Bensham Manor

Beulah

Broad Green

Coulsdon East

Croham

Fairfield

Fieldway

Heathfield

Kenley

Monks Orchard

New Addington

Norbury

Purley

Rylands

Sanderstead

Selsdon

South Norwood

Spring Park

Thornton Heath

Upper Norwood

Waddon

West Thornton

Whitehorse Manor

Woodcote & Coulsdon West

Woodside

References

1990
1990 London Borough council elections